The siege of Almeida may refer to one of a number of historical events including:

 Siege of Almeida (1762), during the Seven Years' War
 Siege of Almeida (1810), during the Peninsular War
 Siege of Almeida (1811), during the Peninsular War